Garphyttan National Park is a Swedish national park in Kilsbergen west of Örebro in Lekeberg Municipality.

References

External links 

Geography of Örebro County
National parks of Sweden
Protected areas established in 1909
1909 establishments in Sweden
Tourist attractions in Örebro County